DEMS may refer to:

Democratic Party (United States)
Devon and Exeter Medical Society
Deepika English Medium School
Defensively equipped merchant ship
Dheeraj Education Management System
Differential Electrochemical Mass Spectroscopy
Damso

See also
 DEM (disambiguation)